Island Nation is a Taiwanese political drama based on Taiwan's transition from an authoritarian state to a democracy in the 1990s. The series will include 80 episodes over 8 seasons, with the first season premiering on January 20, 2020. The second season, Island Nation 2, debuted on September 12, 2021.

Episodes

Production

 was spent on the first season, with the Ministry of Culture subsidizing  in production costs. A replica of the Presidential Office Building was built at a Republic of China Navy base in Taoyuan, while the presidential inauguration scene was filmed in the building itself.

Casting was a challenge, as several local actors and actresses declined roles in the series, for fear of compromising their ability to work in China.

Critical reception

Cinema Escapist described Island Nation as "one of the most compelling series in Taiwanese entertainment history thus far," noting the contrast to the apolitical stance and self-censorship undertaken by many Taiwanese entertainers in order to access China's media market. The second season of the series was promoted by Taiwanese president Tsai Ing-wen on an Instagram post.

References

External links
 

 
  - Season 2 English subtitled episodes

2020s Taiwanese television series debuts
Hokkien-language television shows
Mandarin-language television shows
Political drama television series
Taiwanese drama television series
Television series set in the 1990s
Television shows filmed in Taiwan
Television shows set in Afghanistan
Works about social movements